This is a list of wars of independence (also called liberation wars). These wars may or may not have been successful in achieving a goal of independence.

List

See also
 Lists of active separatist movements
 List of civil wars
 List of ongoing armed conflicts
 National liberation

References